Sheriff of Sage Valley is a 1942 American Western film directed by Sam Newfield.

Plot
Billy, Fuzzy and Jeff interrupt a stagecoach robbery and discover that one of the passengers, the sheriff of Sage Valley was shot in the back by one of the other passengers.  Upon arrival in Sage Valley Mayor Jed Harrison appoints Billy Sheriff to arrest the criminal mastermind Kansas Ed that turns out to be Billy's long lost brother.

Cast 
Buster Crabbe as Billy the Kid / Kansas Ed Bonney
Al St. John as Fuzzy
Dave O'Brien as Jeff
Maxine Leslie as Janet Morley – Casino Singer
Charles King as Sloane, Casino Proprietor
John Merton as Nick Gaynor – Kansas Henchman
Kermit Maynard as Henchman Slim Jankins
Hal Price as Mayor Jed Harrison

Soundtrack 
Maxine Leslie – "The Man Who Broke My Heart" (Written by Johnny Lange and Lew Porter)

See also
The "Billy the Kid" films starring Buster Crabbe: 
 Billy the Kid Wanted (1941)
 Billy the Kid's Round-Up (1941)
 Billy the Kid Trapped (1942)
 Billy the Kid's Smoking Guns (1942)
 Law and Order (1942) 
 Sheriff of Sage Valley (1942) 
 The Mysterious Rider (1942)
 The Kid Rides Again (1943)
 Fugitive of the Plains (1943)
 Western Cyclone (1943)
 Cattle Stampede (1943)
 The Renegade (1943)
 Blazing Frontier (1943)
 Devil Riders (1943)
 Frontier Outlaws (1944)
 Valley of Vengeance (1944)
 The Drifter (1944) 
 Fuzzy Settles Down (1944)
 Rustlers' Hideout (1944)
 Wild Horse Phantom (1944)
 Oath of Vengeance (1944)
 His Brother's Ghost (1945) 
 Thundering Gunslingers (1945)
 Shadows of Death (1945)
 Gangster's Den (1945)
 Stagecoach Outlaws (1945)
 Border Badmen (1945)
 Fighting Bill Carson (1945)
 Prairie Rustlers (1945) 
 Lightning Raiders (1945)
 Terrors on Horseback (1946)
 Gentlemen with Guns (1946)
 Ghost of Hidden Valley (1946)
 Prairie Badmen (1946)
 Overland Riders (1946)
 Outlaws of the Plains (1946)

External links 

1942 films
1942 Western (genre) films
Billy the Kid (film series)
American black-and-white films
American Western (genre) films
Producers Releasing Corporation films
1940s English-language films
Films directed by Sam Newfield
1940s American films